Klaus Bruengel (born in October 1949 in Holzwickede) is a German Composer and bass player.
Noteworthy are his 46 musical representations of the characters and places in Homer's epic Odyssey, summarized in the Odyssey Suite 2014 he composed the ballet suite In Monets Garden.

Life
Bruengel studied music at the Hochschule für Musik Detmold and educational science at the University of Münster. He made a name for himself as composer, bassist and music-arranger with the "Kurt Weil Orchestra" in Sweden and Switzerland, and also as a member of the jazz rock band Time in Space. There followed a number of years as session musician and musical arranger at the WDR (German radio/TV station). He collaborated with Schauspielhaus Bochum, there he played in Saint Joan of the Stockyards by Bertolt Brecht, The Cherry Orchard by Anton Pavlovich Chekhov, The Bat by Johann Strauss II, Bruengel also worked as a bassist with artists like Markus Stockhausen, Herbert Grönemeyer, Jon Eardley and Jimmy Smith. He composed the Musical "Meeresleuchten". His Pseudonym is Nicola de Brun.
2002 he had his own Orchestra and played for the Unicef with Kevin Tarte and Afsaneh Sadeghi.

Publications

Discography 
 Piano sounds of harmony, Verlag Fröndenberg, 1994
 Ballet Music for Exercises Album 1-5, Edition Scores&Parts, Dortmund, 2013
 Preludes for Piano and Small Orchestra, Edition Scores&Parts, Dortmund, 2013
 Nocturnes for Piano, Edition Scores&Parts, Dortmund, 2013
 Four Tangos, Edition Scores&Parts, Dortmund, 2013
 Four Seasons, Edition Scores&Parts, Dortmund, 2013
 Homer’s Epic Odyssey Album 1-2, Edition Scores&Parts, 2013
 Homer’s Epic Odyssey Album 3, EAN 4250782288646, Edition Scores&Parts, 2014
 Kammermusikalische Phantasien, EAN 4250782317865, 2014
 Impressions Album 1-18, EAN 4250782288639, 2014
 Impressions Album 19-36, EAN 4250782290267, 2014
 Music Kaleidoscope, EAN 4250782288622, 2014
 In Monets Garten (Ballett Suite), EAN 4250782287168, 2014
 Ballet Music for Piano Album 1-30, EAN 4250782286314, 2014
 Ballet Music for Piano Album 31-60, EAN 4250782286345, 2014
 Ballet Music for the Professional Dancer, EAN 4250782352439, 2014
 Ballet Music for Dancers, EAN 4250782382931, 2014
 Music for Piano, Harp, Cor Anglais and Oboe D'Amore, EAN 4250782404015, 2015
 Pavane for Harp and Cor Anglais, EAN 4250782406149, 2015
 Scherzino for Oboe and Harp, EAN 4250782411167, 2015
 Piano Music for Ballet (Exercises), EAN 4250928372239, 2016
 Piano Music for Ballet 31-60 (Vol. 2), EAN 4250928388919, 2016
 Woodwinds Nocturne (Woodwinds, Piano and Harp), EAN 4250928391872, 2016
 Nocturne for String Quartet, EAN 4250928393579, 2016
 Kammermusikalische Phantasien 6-10, EAN 4250532598278, 2016
 Impromptu No. 2 (Music for Flute, Oboe, Strings and Piano), EAN 4250887849896, 2016
 Moonlight Dreams Ballet (14 Piano Pieces), EAN 4250887853497, 2017
 Ballet Suite No. 2, EAN 4251177538155, 2017
 Ballet Piano (31 - 60), EAN 4251177545276, 2017
 Côte d' Azur Suite, EAN 4061707001109, 2018
 Poetry for Cor anglais and Piano, EAN 4061707034930, 2018
 Vier Jahreszeiten (Musik für Englischhorn und Klavier), EAN 4061707378539, 2020
 Impromptu 3, EAN 4061707451539, 2020
 Tuesdays Nocturne, EAN 4061707453281, 2020

Notebooks 
 Ballet Music For Exercises 1-5, Edition Scores&Parts, Dortmund, 2013, 
 Preludes for Piano and Small Orchestra, Edition Scores&Parts, Dortmund, 2013, 
 Nocturnes for Piano, Edition Scores&Parts, Dortmund, 2013, 
 Four Tangos, Edition Scores&Parts, Dortmund, 2013, 
 Four Seasons, Edition Scores&Parts, Dortmund, 2013, 
 Homer’s Epic Odyssey 1-2, Edition Scores&Parts, Dortmund, 2013, 
 Jazz Rhythm Changes One, Edition Scores&Parts, Dortmund, 2013, 
 Ballet Music for Piano Album 1-30, ISMN 9790502433055, 2014
 Ballet Music for Piano Album 31-60, ISMN 9790502433062, 2014
 Impressions Album 1-18, ISMN 9790502433079, 2014
 Impressions Album 19-36, ISMN 9790502433086, 2014
 Phantasies, ISMN 9790502433024, 2014
 Music Kaleidoscope, ISMN 9790502433031, 2014
 Musical Meeresleuchten, ISMN 9790502433772
 Ballet Piano 1-30, ISMN 9790502439644, 2015
 Ballet Piano 31-60, ISMN 9790502436865, 2015
 Ballet Music for Exercises, ISMN 9790502439859, 2015
 3 Scores for Jazz Ensemble, ISMN 9790502430368, 2015
 Brass Duets, String Quartet, Piano Solo, ISMN 9790502439996, 2015
 Nocturnes for Piano Solo, ISMN 9790502439835, 2015
 Modality, Modal Pieces for Chamber Orchestra, ISMN 9790502439842, 2015
 Ballet Suite, In Monets Garden, ISMN 9790502439880, 2015
 Ballet Music for Dancers, ISMN 9790502439934, 2015
 Piano Solos, 10 pieces for the piano, ISMN 9790502439811, 2015
 Pieces for Chamber Orchestra, ISMN 9790502439838, 2015
 Meeresleuchten, Musical, ISMN 9790502439897, 2015
 Impressions, Musical Scores for Chamber Orchestra, ISMN 9790502439873, 2015
 Piano Music for Ballet 1-30, ISMN 9790502439750, 2015
 Piano Music for Ballet 31-60, ISMN 9790502439767, 2016
 Nocturne for String Quartet, ISMN 9790502434762, 2016
 Woodwinds Nocturne, Chamber Music, ISMN 9790502439743, 2016
 Ballet Suite No.2, ISMN 9790502435790, 2017
 Impromptu No.2, ISMN 9790502435622, 2017
 Code d' Azur Suite, Piece for Small Orchestra, ISMN 9790502436919, 2018
 Impromptu 3, ISMN 9790502438005, 2020
 Vier Jahreszeiten, ISMN 9790502439002, 2020
 Tuesdays Nocturne, ISMN 9790502438029, 2020
 Regentropfen, ISMN 9790502438050, 2020
 A Quiet Autumn, ISMN 9790502437077, 2020
 One Ruby Tuesday, ISMN 9790502437381, 2020
 Forty Four, ISMN 9790502439408, 2022
 September Piece, ISMN 9790502439446, 2022
 Saturday Dreaming, ISMN 9790502439491, 2022
 Tanz der Prinzessin, ISMN 9790502439538, 2022
 Walzer, ISMN 9790502439576, 2022
 July, ISMN 9790502439606, 2022
 August, ISMN 9790502436308, 2022
 QUARTEN UND ELF ACHTEL, ISMN 9790502436346, 2022
 Pianomusic for Ballet, ISMN 9790502437770, 2022
 Pianomusic for Ballet 2 , ISMN 9790502436407, 2022
 Mohnblume: Sopran Solo , ISMN 9790502436377, 2022
 Rhythm Changes 4, ISMN 9790502436438, 2022
 Samstag: Kammermusik, ISMN 979-0502436445, 2022
 TIME IN SPACE: Kammermusik, ISMN 9790502437220, 2022
 Thursday: Kammermusik, ISMN 9790502437091, 2022
 Saxophone Quartet Music Vol.1, ISMN 9790502437237, 2022
 Saxophone Quartet Music Vol.2, ISMN 9790502437268, 2022
 Peace: Kammermusik, ISMN 9790502437312, 2022

Books 
 Xa-Lando – Lernen als Abenteuer. Materialien. Lesen – Sprache – Sachunterricht, Beteiligung, Schöningh Verlag im Westermann Druck- und Verlagsgruppe|Westermann Schulbuchverlag, 1997, 
 JeKi elementar – Grundlagen Materialien Ideen – Beteiligung, Musikproduktion 2 CDs für Schott Music, 2011, 
 Sylt Impressionen – Bilder Musik Prosa – Edition Scores&Parts, 2011, ISMN 978-0-50243-102-0
 Ballet Music For Exercises 1- 5, Edition Scores&Parts, Dortmund, 2013,

Music Scores

Piano Solo • New Music 
 Provocation • Audio/Video • ISRC DESN91300141
 Fire and Ice • Audio/Video • ISRC DESN91300140
 Ballet Music for Piano • Exercises 1-60 • Edition Scores&Parts • 2014
 Monday • ISMN 9790502431969 • Edition Scores&Parts • 2014

Duets 
Tuba, Piccolo
 Duet for Tuba and Piccolo • Audio/Video • ISRC DESN91300139
Oboe, Trombone
 Duet for Oboe and Trombone • Audio/Video • ISRC DESN91300138

Ensemble Music, Scores incl. Audio 

Flute, Oboe, Strings, Cello, Harp, Piano, Bass
 Impressions 1 - 36  • Edition Scores&Parts • 2013

Flute, Oboe, Piano
 Modality 1 - 8 • Edition Scores&Parts • 2013

Flute, Oboe, Harp, Bassoon, Bass
 Modality 09 La Mer and Fuge • Edition Scores&Parts • 2013

Flute, Oboe, Strings, Harp
 Modality 10 - 11 • Edition Scores&Parts • 2013

Jazz Orchestra
 Jazz Rhythm Changes One - Three • Edition Scores&Parts • 2013

Flute, Oboe, Violins, Cello, Harp, Piano, Bass
 Homer‘s Epic Odyssey III Album 1 - 23 • Edition Scores&Parts • 2013

Flute, Oboe, Violins, Cello, Harp, Bass
 Ballet Suite - In Monets Garden • Edition Scores&Parts • 2014

String Quartet
 Whole Tone piece for String Quartet • ISMN 9790502431846
 Twelve-tone composition for String Quartet • ISMN 9790502431914

Flute, Oboe, Clarinet, Harp
 Impromptu • ISMN 9790502431952

Flute, Cor Anglais, Piano
 Perfect Fourth Game • ISMN 9790502433147

References

External links 
  1
  2
  3
Music Scores Wildt Verlag
Music Scores & Parts Weltbild Verlag

Klaus Bruengel on Jazz Records

1949 births
German composers
Living people
People from Unna (district)
Hochschule für Musik Detmold alumni